Turgay Gölbaşı (born 6 January 1983) is a German-born Turkish former footballer.

References

1983 births
People from Herford (district)
Sportspeople from Detmold (region)
Footballers from North Rhine-Westphalia
German people of Turkish descent
Living people
Turkish footballers
Association football midfielders
KSV Hessen Kassel players
Çaykur Rizespor footballers
Samsunspor footballers
Karşıyaka S.K. footballers
Gaziantep F.K. footballers
Nazilli Belediyespor footballers
Tuzlaspor players
Oberliga (football) players
Regionalliga players
Süper Lig players
TFF First League players
TFF Second League players